Joe Litterio (born January 15, 1971) is an American college baseball coach, was the head coach of the Rutgers Scarlet Knights baseball team.  He has held that position since the 2014 season until the end of the 2019 season. After his playing career with the Scarlet Knights, Litterio served as a volunteer assistant with his alma mater while also coaching at Immaculate Conception High School.  He then became an assistant at Monmouth for four seasons before one season as an assistant with Winthrop.  He then earned his first head coaching job at Wagner, where he remained for twelve seasons.  In 2012, he returned to Rutgers as Associate Head Coach under Fred Hill before assuming the top role two years later. On May 28, 2019, Litterio was let go by not having his contract renewed.

Head coaching record
Below is a table of Litterio's yearly records as an NCAA baseball coach.

References

1971 births
Baseball second basemen
Living people
Monmouth Hawks baseball coaches
Rutgers Scarlet Knights baseball coaches
Rutgers Scarlet Knights baseball players
Wagner Seahawks baseball coaches
Winthrop Eagles baseball coaches